Operation Poker is a 1965 Italian-Spanish spy film produced, written and directed by Osvaldo Civirani. The first choice for the main role was Ken Clark, who was replaced by Roger Browne a few days before the start of filming. It was mainly shot in   Copenhagen.

Cast 
  Roger Browne as Glenn Forest 
  José Greci as Helga
  Sancho Gracia as John Parker
  Roberto Messina as Omar (credited as Bob Messenger)
  Carla Calò as Russian Agent (credited as Carol Brown)
  Andrea Scotti  as Frank (credited as Andrew Scott)
  Helga Liné as Glenn's Girlfriend

References

External links

1965 films
1960s spy thriller films
Spanish spy thriller films
1960s Italian-language films
Italian spy thriller films
Films directed by Osvaldo Civirani
Films scored by Piero Umiliani
1960s Italian films
Films shot in Copenhagen
1960s Spanish films